Miss Earth Colombia or Miss Tierra Colombia is a title given to a woman who is selected to represent Colombia at Miss Earth, an annual international beauty pageant promoting environmental awareness.

The current Miss Earth Colombia is Andrea Aguilera from Antioquia

Titleholders
The Miss Earth Colombia Organization used to appoint a Colombian woman to represent Colombia in Miss Earth. Starting 2014, a national competition was held. The first competition was won by María Alejandra Villafañe Osorio and the competition was held in Armenia, Colombia. On occasion, when the winner does not qualify (due to age) for either contest, a runner-up is sent.

Color Key

See also
Miss Earth
Miss Colombia
Miss Mundo Colombia
Miss Universe Colombia
Miss Grand Colombia

References

External links
Official website

Colombia
Recurring events established in 2001
Colombian awards